Elections to a Legislative Assembly were held in Macau in March 1973.

Background
On 2 May 1972 the Portuguese National Assembly passed the Organic Law for the Overseas Territories, which provided for greater autonomy for overseas territories. The Assembly would have 13 members, one of which would be appointed by the Governor to represent the interests of the Chinese community.

Candidates were required to be Portuguese citizens who had lived in Macau for more than three years and be able to read and write Portuguese. Voters were required to be literate. As the Portuguese constitution banned political parties at the time, the majority of candidates were put forward by the ruling People's National Action movement, although some civic associations were allowed to nominate candidates.

Results
Out of a total population of 248,316, only 2,620 people registered to vote. A total of 1,765 people voted.

References

Legislative election
Macau
Elections in Macau
Macanese legislative election,1973